In mathematical analysis, Krein's condition provides a necessary and sufficient condition for exponential sums

to be dense in a weighted L2 space on the real line. It was discovered by Mark Krein in the 1940s. A corollary, also called Krein's condition, provides a sufficient condition for the indeterminacy of the moment problem.

Statement

Let μ be an absolutely continuous measure on the real line, dμ(x) = f(x) dx. The exponential sums

are dense in L2(μ) if and only if

Indeterminacy of the moment problem

Let μ be  as above; assume that all the moments

of μ are finite. If

holds, then the Hamburger moment problem for μ is indeterminate; that is, there exists another measure ν ≠ μ on R such that

This can be derived from the "only if" part of Krein's theorem above.

Example

Let

the measure dμ(x) = f(x) dx is called the Stieltjes–Wigert measure. Since

the Hamburger moment problem for μ is indeterminate.

References

Theorems in analysis
Theorems in approximation theory